Bristol South Swimming Pool is a swimming pool in Southville, Bristol, UK. It is operated by Everyone Active on behalf of Bristol City Council.

History 
The pool opened in 1931.

In 2010, the pool was featured in an episode of Sherlock.

The pool closed in November 2019 for repair works following the discovery of a leaking pipe. However, it remained closed for longer than anticipated as further repairs were required and work was slowed due to the COVID-19 pandemic and vandalism. It reopened in July 2021.

Facilities 
The building is Grade 2 listed.

References 

1931 establishments in England
Swimming venues in England
Sports venues in Bristol